Dajan may refer to:

 Bayt Dajan, Palestinian Arab village
 Beit Dajan (disambiguation), Palestinian village
 Furush Beit Dajan, Palestinian village

People with the given name
 Dajan Shehi, Albanian professional footballer
 Dajan Šimac, Croatian football defender
 Dajan Ahmet, Estonian actor and stage director of Tatar heritage
 Dajan Hashemi, Danish footballer

See also
 Dejan, a given name
 Ajan (disambiguation)